The 1998 St. Petersburg Open was a tennis tournament played on indoor carpet courts at the Petersburg Sports and Concert Complex in Saint Petersburg, Russia and was part of the World Series of the 1998 ATP Tour. The tournament ran from 9 February through 15 February 1998. First-seeded Richard Krajicek won the singles title.

Finals

Singles

 Richard Krajicek defeated  Marc Rosset 6–4, 7–6(7–5)
 It was Krajicek's 1st title of the year and the 14th of his career.

Doubles

 Nicklas Kulti /  Mikael Tillström defeated  Marius Barnard /  Brent Haygarth 3–6, 6–3, 7–6
 It was Kulti's 1st title of the year and the 8th of his career. It was Tillström's 1st title of the year and the 4th of his career.

References

External links
 Official website  
 Official website 
 ATP tournament profile

St. Petersburg Open
St. Petersburg Open
St. Petersburg Open
St. Petersburg Open